William Beardsley may refer to:
William Beardsley (politician) (born 1942), American politician from Maine
William Beardsley (settler) (1605–1661), one of the first settlers of Stratford, Connecticut
William J. Beardsley (1872–1934), American architect
William S. Beardsley (1901–1954), American politician

See also
William A. Beardslee (1916–2001), American theologian